Drifter was a wafer-based chocolate bar. Rowntree's launched Drifter in 1980, consisting of a  wafer with caramel layered on top, covered with milk chocolate. Nestlé later produced the bar following their takeover of Rowntree's in 1988.

About
90 million bars were produced each year. Among its advertising slogans, it has been referred to as "the chewy chocolate biscuit (pronounced “biz-kwit”) that you really have to get your teeth into."

In 2007, Nestlé discontinued Drifter before reintroducing it in May 2008, enjoying a similar act of nostalgia as Cadbury's Wispa bar. In October 2018, Drifter, which at the time was being produced at the Nestlé Fawdon factory in Newcastle Upon Tyne, UK, was discontinued by Nestlé due to low consumer demand. 

The bar was advertised in the 1990s with a series of TV ads involving people speaking slang or jargon, with the tagline "do you catch my drift?".

McFlurry
In June 2011, McDonald's introduced a limited edition Drifter McFlurry which was available from 15 June until 26 July 2011.

See also
 List of chocolate bar brands

References

External links
  includes nutritional information

1980 establishments in England
Products introduced in 1980
Chocolate bars